The Hotel Rosslyn Annex is a historic building in Los Angeles, California built in 1923 at the corner of 5th and Main streets.  The structure was designed by the firm Parkinson & Parkinson in the Beaux Arts style and listed on the National Register of Historic Places in 2013.

The building is across the street from the original 800-room Rosslyn Hotel built in 1914. Designed as a twin, both were topped by mammoth glowing signs featuring the names surrounded by a heart, the shape acknowledging the Hart brothers who owned the hotels.

The 264-unit Hotel Rosslyn Annex was renovated in 2015 to house a mix of homeless veteran, low-income and market-rate tenants.

See also
 List of Registered Historic Places in Los Angeles
 The Million Dollar Hotel, a 2001 movie

References

Further reading

External links

Hotels in Los Angeles
Buildings and structures in Downtown Los Angeles
Hotel buildings completed in 1923
Hotel buildings on the National Register of Historic Places in Los Angeles
John and Donald Parkinson buildings
Beaux-Arts architecture in California
1923 establishments in California
Main Street (Los Angeles)